"The Only One" is a single by the British band The Cure which was released on 13 May 2008 on Geffen Records in the United Kingdom. The single was released in the United States on 20 May 2008. It is the first single to be released by The Cure in over three and a half years — their last single being 2004's "Taking Off" / "alt.end". It is also the first single from the 2008 album, 4:13 Dream.  The single was produced by Robert Smith and Keith Uddin. The song debuted live on 7 October 2007 in Mountain View, California at a festival and was also played in Mexico City the next week. During that time, the song was known as "Please Project". It was not until early on in the European tour in early 2008 was "The Only One" established as the title.

The B-side, "NY Trip", does not appear on the album.

Reception
In an early review on their website, Canadian music magazine Exclaim!, describes the song as if it could have come from the sessions for the uplifting 1992 album Wish. They went on to add that Smith sounds "happier than ever" and that the song is a return to the form that produced many of their Top 40 hits. The Observer described the song as having all the ingredients of a classic Cure song by having "lovely spiralling guitars, glowing bass and Robert Smith at his giddiest". Saying that the song sounds "like a pop single by The Cure", Pitchfork adds that the lyrics are not distinctive and goes on to say that the release will not make anyone forget the previous great singles from the band.

Track listing
"The Only One (Mix 13)" – 3:57
"NY Trip" – 3:39

Charts

References

2008 singles
2008 songs
The Cure songs
Geffen Records singles
Number-one singles in Spain
Songs written by Jason Cooper
Songs written by Porl Thompson
Songs written by Robert Smith (musician)
Songs written by Simon Gallup